"For Whom the Bell Tolls" is a song by the Bee Gees, released on 15 November 1993 as the second single from their 20th studio album, Size Isn't Everything (1993). It peaked at number four on the UK Singles Chart and number six in Ireland. This song would be the band's highest-charting single in the UK during the 1990s, giving them a UK top-five single in four consecutive decades: the 1960s, 1970s, 1980s, and 1990s. A music video, filmed in New York, was also released for this song.

Critical reception
Alan Jones from Music Week gave the song three out of five, complimenting it as a "pleasant ballad".

Track listings

 UK cassette single
A1. "For Whom the Bell Tolls"
A2. "Stayin' Alive"
B1. "Too Much Heaven"
B2. "Massachusetts"

 UK 12-inch single
A1. "For Whom the Bell Tolls" – 3:55
A2. "Decadance" (classic house mix) – 9:30
B1. "Decadance" (club mix) – 5:50
B2. "Decadance" (vocal mix) – 5:43

 European CD single
 "For Whom the Bell Tolls"
 "Decadance" (club mix)

 US CD and cassette single
 "For Whom the Bell Tolls" – 5:06
 "New York Mining Disaster 1941" – 2:08
 "I've Gotta Get a Message to You" – 3:06
 "Massachusetts (Lights Went Out)" – 2:22

Charts

Weekly charts

Year-end charts

Certifications

References

1993 singles
1993 songs
Bee Gees songs
Polydor Records singles
Songs written by Barry Gibb
Songs written by Maurice Gibb
Songs written by Robin Gibb